Coastal Zone at Portrush (formerly the Portrush Countryside Centre) is a visitor centre at Portrush, County Antrim, Northern Ireland.

The visitor centre has an exhibition space that covers the natural history, environment, and local history of the area. It is operated by the Department of Agriculture, Environment and Rural Affairs (DAERA). It is directly on the coast, looking out to the Skerries. There is a nature reserve nearby.

See also
 Ramore Head, an Area of Special Scientific Interest

References

External links
 Coastal Zone at Portrush website
 Coastal Zone at Portrush - Visit Portrush

Year of establishment missing
Tourist attractions in County Antrim
Visitor centres in the United Kingdom
Portrush
Nature centres in Northern Ireland
Natural history museums in Northern Ireland